Forud Castle is a historical castle located in Gonabad County in Razavi Khorasan Province, The longevity of this fortress dates back to the Parthian Empire.

References 

Castles in Iran
Parthian castles
Castles of the Nizari Ismaili state